Jean Boghossian (born 1949) is a Belgian-Lebanese artist, sculptor, and painter of Armenian descent. He is one of the few artists globally who experiment by applying fire and smoke to his works.

Early life 
Jean Boghossian was born in Aleppo, Syria. His father, Robert Boghossian, was a 4th generation jeweler and businessman who encouraged his sons Jean and Albert to learn the family trade, which led the brothers to pursue apprenticeships in jewelry from a very young age.

According to Boghossian, his father believed "the son of a jeweler must be a designer", and therefore from the age of six years old he was given private drawing lessons by a teacher that would visit him at his home.

Working with fire 
Although Jean Boghossian did not personally subscribe to any one school, he is associated with the Zero movement and Fluxus. The artist says fire became his medium of choice after 14 years of experimentation. In a jeweler family, handling various torches is a common practice in the handmade jewelery making process, which he explains is why he gravitated towards this specific style.

His process involves burning paper, canvas and plastics in his works. Although working with fire usually present different shades of black and grey, Boghossian tends to incorporate a vibrant colour palette that stems from his background as an expert in diamonds, precious stones and jewelery, sometimes leading to artworks which are more colourful. To achieve this, he incorporates the use of watercolors, oil paints & pigments.

Through a process of destruction and re-creation, the boundaries between drawing, painting and sculpture seem blured in Boghossian's work. Some of the art galleries that have worked with him in the past have called him an alchemist for his work with fire, which poses many hazard risks.

Other works from Boghossian make use of a folding technique that looks similar to a crease pattern, as well as collage, these help add a new dimension to the artworks as they are subjected to fire in his process. Boghossian's sculptures are usually made from wood, marble, bronze or polystyrene.

At the Venice Biennale 

After Armenia won the Golden Lion at the 56th Venice Biennale in 2015, the Ministry of Culture of the Republic of Armenia invited Jean Boghossian, an ethnic Armenian, to represent the country during the 57th Venice Biennale in 2017.

Titled “La Fiamma Inestinguibile”, the exhibition was held from May 13 to November 26, 2017, displayed at two venues, Collegio Armeno Moorat-Raphael, at Palazzo Zenobio, and Chiesa di Santa Croce degli Armeni, on Calle Dei Armeni (Armenia Street). The curator of this exhibition was  Bruno Corà, Italian art critic and President of the Burri Foundation.

Jean Boghossian and Bruno Corà returned to Venice during the 59th edition of the Biennale in 2022, this time showcasing an independent work on the terrace of the Compagnia della Vela on the Molo Marciano in St Mark's Basin. A large sculpture-installation titled Melencolia Contemporanea, 2022, inspired by Albrecht Dürer’s engraving Melencolia I, 1514.

Jean Boghossian and Bruno Corà 

After a visit to the artists studio in 2015, a friend of Jean Boghosdian had taken a few catalogues to share with some friends. One of those people happened to be Bruno Corà, president of the Burri Foundation, who found interest in Boghossian's works and reached out to him after a few months . The two would meet later that year during Art Basel 2015 and spend some time discussing various topics.

Around that period, Boghossian was invited to exhibit at the Beirut Exhibition Center in Lebanon. Given the occasion he invited Bruno Corà to visit him in his studio in Brussels, and the Italian curator and art critic accepted. The meeting proved to be a success as Corà later traveled to Beirut and curated Tra Due Fuochi in 2016.

The following year Boghossian would be called to represent Armenia during the 57th Venice Biennale. The exhibition, titled La Fiamma Inestinguibile, was also curated by Bruno Corà.

Over the years Bruno Corà has curated multiple exhibitions of Jean Boghossian, which include museum solo shows such as Sensitive Traces at the Museum of Ixelles in Brussels (2017), Building with Fire at the L’Orient le Jour Building in Beirut  (2018), Cease Fire! at the Palace of Nations in Geneva (2019) and Dialogue at the Matenadaran in Yerevan (2022). And an intsallation, Melencholia Contemporanea, during the 59th Venice Biennale in 2022.

Bruno Corà has been an art critic and curator since the mid-1960s. Currently president of the Burri Foundation, he has curated several international art Biennals; such as Dakar, Gubbio and La Spezia. He has more than three hundred critical essays on contemporary art that have been published in monographs, newspapers, and trade journals.

Corà has curated exhibitions of international artists such as Giuseppe Uncini, Vincenzo Agnetti, Alberto Burri, Louise Nevelson, Yves Klein, Alighiero Boetti, Lucio Fontana, Michelangelo Pistoletto, Fausto Melotti, Enrico Castellani, Luciano Fabro, Giulio Paolini, and Francesco Lo Savio.

Notes

Lebanese artists
1949 births
Living people